"War of the Robots" is a BBC Books adventure book written by Trevor Baxendale and is based on the long-running British science fiction television series Doctor Who.
It features the Tenth Doctor and Martha.

This is part of the Decide Your Destiny series which make the reader choose what happens in the book.

Plot
On a distant world populated by robots, war has been raging for many years. Can you, the Doctor and Martha discover why the robots are fighting and end the war once and for all?

Reception
The book has received some mixed reviews. It was part of a second set of four books, which were successful enough to allow the range to continue.

References

2007 British novels
2007 science fiction novels
Decide Your Destiny gamebooks
Tenth Doctor novels
Books by Trevor Baxendale